Tashkinovo (Taşkinov) is a rural locality (a selo) in Neftekamsk, Bashkortostan, Russia. The population was 2,467 as of 2010. There are 44 streets.

Geography 
Tashkinovo is located 6 km south of Neftekamsk. Neftekamsk is the nearest rural locality.

References 

Rural localities in Neftekamsk urban okrug